"Chapter 4" is the fourth episode of the sixth season of the anthology television series American Horror Story. It aired on October 5, 2016, on the cable network FX. The episode was written by John J. Gray and directed by Marita Grabiak.

Plot
Following Matt's affair with Scathach, Shelby thinks that Matt and Lee are conspiring against her. Later that night, Shelby is attacked by a man with the head of a pig. She is saved by Dr. Elias Cunningham, who explains that he has been the house's guardian for years. Cunningham leads the Millers to where Priscilla is keeping Flora as a hostage. Cunningham pleads with Priscilla to release Flora, but Thomasin's men shoot him to death. The Millers flee back to the house, where Cricket is waiting for them.

Cricket heads back into the woods and comes face to face with Scathach, who is revealed to be the true leader of the Roanoke Colony. Cricket explains that Matt had sex with Scathach in exchange for information about Roanoke. Upon accepting, Scathach transported him into her memories of the Lost Colony, a community whose bounty is directly derived from the practice of human sacrifice. Thomasin's son, Ambrose, objected to the sacrifices and rebelled against his mother's rule. Thomasin killed the entire colony, thus binding them to the land for the rest of eternity.

That night, Scathach demands the payment that is owed to her. Under her seduction, Matt learns of Scáthach's history. Shelby awakes to find Matt missing and goes outside, where she is confronted by Thomasin and her torch-bearing mob. She yells out for Matt and he comes running to her side, leaving Scáthach behind. Thomasin is about to sacrifice Flora, but with the help of Priscilla, she is able to escape to the Millers. The Millers then flee inside the house and Thomasin brings Cricket forward as a replacement. Ambrose and Thomasin proceed to disembowel Cricket as the Millers watch in horror.

Reception
Chapter 4 was watched by 2.83 million people during its original broadcast, and gained a 1.4 ratings share among adults aged 18–49.

The episode received a 91% approval rating on Rotten Tomatoes, based on 11 reviews with an average score of 6.9/10. The critical consensus reads, ""Chapter 4" reintroduces some classic American Horror Story chills while providing answers to epic questions and hinting at links to prior seasons."

References

External links
 

American Horror Story: Roanoke episodes